Saliou Ciss (born 15 September 1989) is a Senegalese professional footballer who plays as a left-back and left midfielder for the Senegal national team.

Club career
Ciss received his footballing education at the Diambars academy in Senegal.

Following his graduation, he joined Serigne Kara, a fellow graduate, at Tromsø prior to the 2010 season, signing a five-year contract. He made his Tippeligaen debut as a substitute against Brann on 5 May 2010.

In August 2013 he joined Ligue 1 side Valenciennes for €500,000.

In July 2017 he signed a three-year contract with Ligue 1 side Angers on a free transfer.

After six months on loan with Valenciennes in January to June 2018, he went there again on loan too in January 2019.

International career
Ciss represented Senegal at the 2012 Summer Olympics. In May 2018, he was named in Senegal's 23-man squad for the 2018 FIFA World Cup in Russia. On 17 June however, he injured himself in training and was replaced in the squad by Adama Mbengue.

Career statistics

Club

International

Honours
Senegal
Africa Cup of Nations: 2021; runner-up: 2019

Individual
Africa Cup of Nations Team of the Tournament: 2021

References

1989 births
Living people
Footballers from Dakar
Association football fullbacks
Association football midfielders
Senegalese footballers
Diambars FC players
Tromsø IL players
Valenciennes FC players
Angers SCO players
AS Nancy Lorraine players
Eliteserien players
Ligue 1 players
Ligue 2 players
Senegal international footballers
2011 CAF U-23 Championship players
Olympic footballers of Senegal
Footballers at the 2012 Summer Olympics
2017 Africa Cup of Nations players
2019 Africa Cup of Nations players
2021 Africa Cup of Nations players
Africa Cup of Nations-winning players
Senegalese expatriate footballers
Senegalese expatriate sportspeople in Norway
Expatriate footballers in Norway
Senegalese expatriate sportspeople in France
Expatriate footballers in France